Elko is a town in Barnwell County, South Carolina, United States. According to the 2010 census the population was 193.

Geography
Elko is located in northern Barnwell County at  (33.380563, -81.379321). U.S. Route 78 passes through the center of the town, leading east  to Blackville and west  to Williston. South Carolina Highway 37 crosses US 78 at the center of Elko, leading south  to Barnwell, the county seat, and northeast  to Springfield.

Demographics

According to the 2000 census, there were 212 people, 92 households, and 65 families living in the town. The population density was 183.0 people per square mile (70.6/km²). There were 102 housing units at an average density of 88.0 per square mile (34.0/km²).  The racial makeup of the town was 41.51% White and 58.49% African American.
Of the 92 households 29.3% had children under the age of 18 living with them, 42.4% were married couples living together, 23.9% had a female householder with no husband present, and 28.3% were non-families. 26.1% of households were one person and 9.8% were one person aged 65 or older. The average household size was 2.30 and the average family size was 2.73.

The age distribution was 24.5% under the age of 18, 2.8% from 18 to 24, 29.7% from 25 to 44, 28.8% from 45 to 64, and 14.2% 65 or older. The median age was 42 years. For every 100 females there were 92.7 males. For every 100 females age 18 and over, there were 86.0 males.

The median household income was $23,571 and the median family income  was $37,500. Males had a median income of $35,536 versus $27,083 for females. The per capita income for the town was $15,973. About 19.0% of families and 22.9% of the population were below the poverty line, including 36.1% of those under the age of eighteen and 51.5% of those sixty five or over.

References

Towns in Barnwell County, South Carolina